James Martin Fitzpatrick (June 27, 1869 – April 10, 1949) of the Bronx was a Democratic U.S. Representative from New York from 1927 to 1945.

Biography 
James Martin Fitzpatrick was born in West Stockbridge, Massachusetts on June 27, 1869.  He attended school in Massachusetts and worked in the cotton mills and iron ore mines of West Stockbridge.

Early career 
In 1891 he moved to The Bronx, where he was employed by the Metropolitan Street Railroad Company and the Interborough Rapid Transit Company until 1925, when he became involved in the real estate business as a partner in the firm Fitzpatrick & Domph.

Fitzpatrick served as a Commissioner of Street Openings and Improvements for the Bronx in 1919, and a member of the New York City Board of Aldermen from 1919 to 1927.

Congress 
In 1926 he was elected to Congress and served nine terms, March 4, 1927, to January 3, 1945.

Later career and death 
Fitzpatrick did not run for reelection in 1944 and retired to New York City.  He died there on April 10, 1949, and was buried in Saint Raymond's Cemetery.

References

 New York Times, J.M. Fitzpatrick, Ex-Congressman; Representative of the Old 24th District, Bronx, for 9 Terms Is Dead, April 11, 1949
 Bronx County Biographies, Biography of James M. Fitzpatrick, reprinted from 1927's "The Bronx and its People: A History, 1609-1927", James L. Wells, Louis F. Haffen, editors, Lewis Historical Publishing Company, publisher.

People from the Bronx
People from West Stockbridge, Massachusetts
1869 births
1949 deaths
Democratic Party members of the United States House of Representatives from New York (state)